Minuscule 562 (in the Gregory-Aland numbering), ε 604 (in the Soden numbering), is a Greek minuscule manuscript of the New Testament, on paper. Palaeographically it has been assigned to the 16th century. 
Scrivener labelled it by number 522.

Description 

The codex contains the text of the Gospel of John on the first 58 leaves (size ). The leaves 59-78 contain Mithridates. The manuscript was written by many hands. The writing is in one column per page, 20 lines per page. It contains Latin  (chapters) at the left margin.

Text 
It does not contain the text of Pericope Adulterae (John 7:53-8:11).
Aland did not place the Greek text of the codex in any Category.

History 

The manuscript was announced by Gustav Haenel. It was added to the list of the New Testament manuscripts by Scrivener (522). Gregory saw it in 1883.

Currently the manuscript is housed at the Glasgow University Library (Ms. Hunter 170) in Glasgow.

See also 

 List of New Testament minuscules
 Biblical manuscript
 Textual criticism
 Minuscule 560
 Minuscule 561

References

Further reading 

 Gustavus Haenel, Catalogi librorum manuscriptorum qui in bibliothecis Galliae, Helvetiae, Belgii, Britaniae M., Hispaniae, Lusitaniae Asservantur, Lipsiae 1830. 
 W. H. P. Hatch, Facsimiles and descriptions of minuscule manuscripts of the New Testament (Cambridge, Mass., 1951), C

External links 
 Minuscule 562 at the CSNTM

Greek New Testament minuscules
16th-century biblical manuscripts
University of Glasgow Library collection